Ochlodes is a Holarctic genus in the skipper butterfly family, Hesperiidae. The genus is placed in the tribe Hesperiini.

Examples of Ochlodes species:

Ochlodes agricola Boisduval 1852 California to Oregon
Ochlodes amurensis Mabille 1909 Amur Oblast – may be forma of Ochlodes venata (Bremer & Grey, 1853)
Ochlodes asahinai Shirozu Japan 
Ochlodes batesi Bell 1935 Haiti
Ochlodes bouddha Mabille 1876 China
Ochlodes brahma Moore 1878 Northwest Himalaya
Ochlodes crataeis Leech 1893 China
Ochlodes flavomaculata Draeseke & Reuss
Ochlodes formosana Matsumura 1919 Taiwan – may be subspecies of Ochlodes subhyalina (Bremer & Grey, 1853)
Ochlodes hasegawai Chiba & Tsukiyama 1996
Ochlodes hyrcanna Christoph 1893
Ochlodes klapperichii Evans 1940
Ochlodes lanta Evans 1939
Ochlodes linga Evans 1939
Ochlodes ochracea Bremer 1861 Amur, Southeast China, Japan
Ochlodes parvus Kurentzov 1970 Mongolia
Ochlodes pasca Evans 1949 Khasi Hills, Assam, Sikkim
Ochlodes sagitta Hemming 1934
Ochlodes samenta Dyar 1914 Mexico
Ochlodes similis Leech 1893 China
Ochlodes siva Moore 1878 Khasi Hills
Ochlodes snowi (WH Edwards 1877)
Ochlodes subhyalina Bremer & Grey 1853 China, Mongolia  Korea, Japan, India, Khasi Hills, Assam, Sikkim, North Burma, Taiwan
Ochlodes sylvanoides (Boisduval 1852) – woodland skipper
Ochlodes sylvanoides napa (WH Edwards 1865) – Napa skipper
Ochlodes sylvanus Esper 1778 – large skipper
Ochlodes thibetana Oberthuer 1886 Sichuan, Tibet Autonomous Region, Yunnan
Ochlodes venata Bremer & Grey 1853
Ochlodes yuma (WH Edwards 1873) – Yuma skipper or giant-reed skipper – California

References and external links

Systematic list of the butterflies of Norway
Canadian Biodiversity Information Facility
Species records from University of Colorado Museum
Skipper news: taxonomic Hesperiinae
 Images representing Ochlodes at Consortium for the Barcode of Life

 
Hesperiidae genera